Bobby McAvan is a retired Scottish-Canadian professional soccer player.  After retiring, he became a commentator on the Baltimore Blast games, before coaching them for the 2002-03 season.

External links
MISL stats

1953 births
Baltimore Blast (1980–1992) players
Living people
Major Indoor Soccer League (1978–1992) coaches
Major Indoor Soccer League (1978–1992) players
Canadian soccer players
Association football utility players
Canadian soccer coaches
National Professional Soccer League (1984–2001) commentators